Dalian Neusoft University of Information (abbreviated DNUI), formerly known as Neusoft Institute of Information, is a private university with few campuses in Dalian, Foshan and Chengdu within China, specializing in information technology.

Dalian Neusoft University of Information is ranked 91st in WURI Global Top 100 Innovative Universities Ranking 2022.

History 
The Dalian Neusoft University of Information opened in Dalian (Liaoning province) as a joint venture of Neusoft Group (60%) and Dalian Software Park Co., Ltd. (40%), as a private university attached to Northeastern University, Shenyang. 

In 2001, the Neusoft Institute Guangdong (Formerly known as Nanhai Neusoft Institute of Information) opened at Nanhai Software Park in Foshan (Guangdong province), as well as the Chengdu Neusoft University in Dujiangyan, near Chengdu (Sichuan Province).

During the Sichuan earthquake in 2008, the campus at Chengdu was damaged. Approximately 3,000 students had to move to the Dalian campus.

Academics 
Each year, 4,000 new students are admitted to the Dalian campus. 

DNUI offers following subjects:
Information Science
Information Management
Embedded Software
Animation
English Taught by native teachers
Japanese Taught by native teachers

The university houses an electronic library.

Accreditation and memberships 
DNUI is a member of SAP University Alliances.

Partner institutions 
DNUI has established partnerships with many universities in multiple countries and regions including Australia, Japan, Russia, United Kingdom and United States.

Below are the partial list of DNUI's institutions partners:

 Australia
Australian National University
Swinburne University of Technology
University of Adelaide
University of Queensland
University of South Australia
 Japan
Waseda University
Ritsumeikan University
Sophia University
Chiba University
Hokuriku University
Kokushikan University
University of Aizu
Nagoya Institute of Technology
Shibaura Institute of Technology
Asia University
University of East Asia
J. F. Oberlin University
Kyoto Sangyo University
Okayama Shoka University
Josai International University
Nagasaki University of Foreign Studies
Hokkaido Information University
Kyoto College of Graduate Studies for Informatics
 Russia
Russian University of Transport
Altai State University
 United Kingdom
Durham University
Lancaster University
University of East Anglia
University of Sussex
 United States
Montclair State University

Rankings and reputation

WURI Global Top 100 Innovative Universities Rankings

See also 

 Liu Jiren
 Neusoft
 Chengdu Neusoft University

External links 
 Official website 
 Dalian Software Park

References 

 Kenichi Ohmae, "China Impact", (Kodansha, 2002) in Japanese
 Mitsuhiro Seki, “The Academic-Industrial Complex in China", (Shinhyoron, 2007) in Japanese

Education in Guangzhou
Educational institutions established in 2001
Universities and colleges in Chengdu
Universities and colleges in Dalian
Universities and colleges in Guangdong
2001 establishments in China